Princess Amelias origins are obscure. Between 1803 and 1804 she made one voyage from London as a slave ship in the triangular trade in enslaved people. She apparently was broken up in the West Indies after having delivered the slaves that she had brought from West Africa.

Career
Princess Amelia first appeared in Lloyd's Register (LR) in 1803.

Captain Peter Bogle acquired a letter of marque on 24 June 1803. However, he had sailed from London on 26 March. Princess Amelia started acquiring slaves on 10 May at Cape Coast Castle. She then gathered more at Whydah, which was where she made most of her purchases. She stopped at Barbados, and sailed for Demerara. She arrived at Kingston, Jamaica, with John Laten, master, on 1 January 1804 with 306 slaves.

Fate
Princess Amelia then disappeared from Lloyd's Lists ship arrival and departure data. She was condemned and broken up after having disembarked the slaves she was carrying. Her entry in the Register of Shipping (RS) for 1806 bears the later annotation "Broke up".

Notes

Citations

1800s ships
London slave ships